WGGC (95.1 FM) is a country music–formatted radio station licensed to and serving Bowling Green, Kentucky, United States. The station is owned by Skytower Communications. Its transmitter is located in northern Allen County on Kentucky Route 101 near the Warren/Allen County line. Its broadcasting studio is located at 1727 US 31W Bypass in Bowling Green.

History

The early years in Glasgow
The station's application history dates back to 1959-60, when the call letters were going to be WKAY-FM to match with WKAY-AM, but the WGGC call letters were assigned by the FCC in July 1960. Originally licensed to and located in Glasgow, Kentucky, the station first signed on the air on June 23, 1961 under ownership of Glasgow Broadcasting Company (now Heritage Communications, Inc.), which also owned WKAY-AM radio (now WCLU). At the time of its inception, WGGC was the first FM radio station ever to sign on in south central Kentucky as all other FM signals came from either Nashville, Louisville,  Central City, or Owensboro. Both WGGC and WKAY shared studios at 510 Happy Valley Road (Kentucky Route 351, now Kentucky Route 90) in Glasgow; that facility was demolished in November 2014 to make room for a new drug store. Clovis and Moena Sadler, who were managing WKAY for several years, purchased WGGC and WKAY in 1971. During the first two decades of WGGC's existence, the station began as an almost-full-time simulcast of WKAY until the late 1960s.

Formats over the years
Shortly before 1970, the station was broadcasting a religious format, and later a gospel music format, and eventually began broadcasting their country music format by 1975, thereby becoming one of the first country music stations on the FM dial in southern Kentucky.

Signal upgrade and new transmitter site
By 1985, WGGC's signal was upgraded to operate with 100,000 watts of effective radiated power. In 1988, the station's origination was moved to its present transmitting site in Allen County. At one point in 1989, the station's callsign was changed to WPRX, but reverted back to the WGGC callsign sometime in 1992, and until 2002, it was known on air as "Country 95."

Changes of ownership
From 1988 through the mid-1990s, both WGGC and WCLU were under ownership of Royse Radio, Inc. While the ownership of both WCLU and WCLU-FM remained in the hands of Royse Radio, WGGC was sold to Heritage Communications in October 1997.

Relocation to Bowling Green
In 2002, WGGC moved its broadcasting license to Bowling Green, where the station's current broadcast facilities are currently located. From 2002 until 2010, the station was branded as "95.1 WGGC." It began branding itself as "Dolby Digital 95.1" in late 2010 before using its current "Goober 95.1" branding.

Community service
WGGC has often been involved in community service; most recently in June 2014, when the station, in conjunction with the southern Kentucky chapter of United Way, hosted a radio-thon to raise money for country music superstar Dolly Parton's Imagination Library. It became an annual event beginning in 2015. On February 4, 2020, WGGC was awarded the United Way Media Partner Advocacy Award, for its "United Way Wednesdays" segments in 2019, on Big Rick In The Morning.

December 2021 tornado
In the wee hours of December 11, 2021, WGGC was one of a handful of local radio and television outlets in Bowling Green that were knocked off the air due to an EF3 tornado that impacted portions of the city. WGGC's studio was within the path of the tornado when it struck the corridor along the US 31W Bypass near downtown Bowling Green; it produced substantial damage at and around the studio and offices. The station returned to the air several days later following the efforts to clean the damage at the studio.

Programming and format
WGGC broadcasts a country music format, therefore competing with three other country formatted stations in the same market: WBVR-FM 96.7, Cave City-licensed WHHT 103.7, and Glasgow-based WLYE-FM 94.1 for ratings. WGGC also competes with out-of-market country stations like WSM-AM, WSM-FM, WKDF and WSIX-FM in Nashville, along with WBKR in Owensboro for the allegiances of the local listener due to Bowling Green's close proximity to both nearby cities.

WGGC hosts include: Krysta; and Greg Almond. Syndicated shows from Westwood One include The Big Time with Whitney Allen and The Lia Show.

In addition to country music, WGGC has also been the area's longtime home for Kentucky Wildcats football and men's basketball games from the UK Sports Network by JMI Sports.

Nominations and awards

In 2020, former morning host "Big Rick" Daniels was nominated for the 55th Academy of Country Music Awards for On-Air Personality of the Year – Small Market., and for the 54th  Country Music Association Awards for Small Market Personality of the Year.

References

External links

GGC
Radio stations established in 1961
Country radio stations in the United States
Mass media in Bowling Green, Kentucky